The Ultra-Fab Sundowner, also called the Sundowner Convertible, is an American ultralight aircraft that was designed by Bob Leinen and produced by Ultra-Fab. The aircraft was supplied as a kit for amateur construction.

Design and development
It features a strut-braced high wing, a single-seat, conventional landing gear and a single engine in tractor configuration.

The aircraft is made from bolted-together aluminum tubing, covered in Dacron sailcloth. Its  span wing is supported by "V" struts and jury struts. A single aluminum tube acts as the fuselage keel and supports the tail at the aft end, the wings in the middle and the engine at the front. The engines supplied include the  Rotax 277 and the  Cuyuna UL II. The aircraft may be flown with an open cockpit or with zippered sailcloth cockpit enclosure panels installed for cold weather flying. The controls are conventional three-axis and include a center stick, adjustable rudder pedals and full-span ailerons. The landing gear has aluminum torsion suspension on all wheels and the tailwheel is steerable.

The aircraft was introduced just as the ultralight market in the US became saturated and demand collapsed. As a result, even though the Sundowner had many innovative features, it was not a commercial success.

Specifications (Sundowner)

References

External links
Drawing of the Sundowner

1980s United States ultralight aircraft
Homebuilt aircraft
Single-engined tractor aircraft